In enzymology, a pyrroline-2-carboxylate reductase is an enzyme that catalyzes the chemical reaction

L-proline + NAD(P)+  1-pyrroline-2-carboxylate + NAD(P)H + H+

The 3 substrates of this enzyme are L-proline, NAD+, and NADP+, whereas its 4 products are 1-pyrroline-2-carboxylate, NADH, NADPH, and H+.

This enzyme belongs to the family of oxidoreductases, specifically those acting on the CH-NH group of donors with NAD+ or NADP+ as acceptor.  The systematic name of this enzyme class is L-proline:NAD(P)+ 2-oxidoreductase. This enzyme is also called Delta1-pyrroline-2-carboxylate reductase.  This enzyme participates in lysine degradation and arginine and proline metabolism.

References

 

EC 1.5.1
NADPH-dependent enzymes
NADH-dependent enzymes
Enzymes of unknown structure